Grevillea polyacida is a species of flowering plant in the family Proteaceae and is endemic to the Top End of the Northern Territory in Australia. It is an open, erect shrub with egg-shaped leaves, the edges with sharply pointed teeth, and clusters of hairy, greenish flowers.

Description

Taxonomy
Grevillea polyacida was first formally described in 1986 by Donald McGillivray in his book New Names in Grevillea (Proteaceae) from specimens collected on Eva Valley Station in 1973. The specific epithet (polyacida) means "many points", referring to the sharp teeth on the leaves.

Distribution and habitat
This species occurs in the Top End of the Northern Territory, in eastern Arnhem Land, including Kakadu National Park, where it grows in eucalypt woodland on sandstone.

References

polyacida
Proteales of Australia
Endemic flora of Australia
Flora of the Northern Territory
Taxa named by Donald McGillivray
Plants described in 1986